Pseudatteria chrysanthema is a species of moth of the family Tortricidae. It is found in Colombia, Guyana, Venezuela, Ecuador, Bolivia and Brazil.

References

Moths described in 1912
Pseudatteria